A Little Virtuous (French: La petite vertu) is a 1968 French comedy crime film directed by Serge Korber and starring Dany Carrel, Jacques Perrin and Robert Hossein. It is based on the 1951 novel But a Short Time to Live by British writer James Hadley Chase, originally published under his pen name Raymond Marshall.

Cast
 Dany Carrel as Claire Augagneur 
 Jacques Perrin as Ferdinand / Freddy 
 Robert Hossein as Louis Brady 
 Pierre Brasseur as Jules Polnick 
 Alfred Adam as Marcel dit 'Lajoie' - l'homme du bar 
 Micheline Luccioni as Doris 
 Roger Bontemps as Le type du bar 
 Michel Creton as François 
 Jean-Claude Massoulier as Hubert 
 Odile Poisson as Martine 
 Yvon Sarray as Le gérant de la brasserie 
 Philippe Vallauris as Marcel - le barman de la brasserie 
 Cécile Vassort as Janine 
 Robert Dalban as Lorenzi 
 Raymond Gérôme as Kerman

References

Bibliography 
 Philippe Rège. Encyclopedia of French Film Directors, Volume 1. Scarecrow Press, 2009.

External links 
 

1968 films
French crime comedy films
1960s crime comedy films
1960s French-language films
Films directed by Serge Korber
Films scored by Georges Delerue
Gaumont Film Company films
Films based on British novels
Films based on works by James Hadley Chase
Films with screenplays by Michel Audiard
1960s French films